The 1947 Baltimore mayoral election saw the election of Thomas D'Alesandro Jr.

General election
The general election was held on May 6.

References

Baltimore mayoral
Mayoral elections in Baltimore
Baltimore